Total is a range of breakfast cereals made by General Mills for the United States market, first launched in 1961. It consists of whole grain wheat flakes. Some varieties of Total supply 100% of the United States Department of Agriculture's recommended daily allowance for each of the following different vitamins and dietary minerals: vitamin C, calcium, iron, vitamin E, thiamin, riboflavin, niacin, vitamin B6, folic acid, vitamin B12, pantothenic acid and zinc.

Varieties of Total are: 
Total
Total Cranberry Crunch
Total Whole Grain 
Total Cinnamon Crunch
Total Blueberry Pomegranate (note: does not contain actual blueberries or pomegranate)

These varieties provide different amounts of vitamins and minerals than regular Total.  For example, Raisin Bran does not provide vitamin C.

Discontinued varieties include:
Total Raisin Bran
Total Oatmeal
Total Corn Flakes
Brown Sugar & Oat Total
Total Protein

External links

Official website

General Mills cereals
Products introduced in 1961
Flaked breakfast cereals